The Herzog Anton Ulrich Museum (HAUM) is an art museum in the German city of Braunschweig, Lower Saxony.

History
Founded in 1754, the Herzog Anton Ulrich Museum is one of the oldest museums in Europe.  The museum has its origins in the art and natural history cabinet of Duke Charles I of Brunswick, which he opened in 1754 at the suggestion of the Dutch physician Daniel de Superville. It was one of the first museums in Germany to open to the public and was opened only one year after the British Museum in London. This "cabinet" included a collection of handicraft works and sculptures from the Baroque and Renaissance, but also ancient works of art from outside Europe. The natural history collection later became the basis of the Natural History Museum. 

The current museum building was opened in 1887. Its architect, Oskar Sommer, planned the building in Italian Renaissance style. In 2010 an extension building was added to the museum. The historical building was closed for renovation for seven years. The museum reopened on 23 October 2016.

Collection

The museum houses an important collection of Western old master paintings, and is especially strong in Northern European art since the Renaissance, including works by Cranach (a very strong collection), Holbein, Dürer, Van Dyck, Rubens, and Rembrandt. Rarities include a single work each by Vermeer, Giorgione and Rosso Fiorentino.  The museum is based on the Schloss Salzdahlum art collection of Anthony Ulrich, Duke of Brunswick-Lüneburg (1633–1714), after whom it is named. In old catalogs, the term Bilder-Galerie zu Salzthalen refers to this collection.

The print room, with over 100,000 prints and 10,000 drawings, is of international importance. There are also temporary exhibitions of art from all over the world. Among the  manuscript items is the journal of Matthäus Schwarz, an accountant very interested in fashion who documented his outfits throughout his adult life at a time when it was thought that people not of the highest rank dressed drably. It is the first known fashion book.

The museum's collection of medieval objects is housed at Dankwarderode Castle.

Provenance Research 
The museum launched a project to research artworks acquired in the 1940s from the art dealer H. W. Lange in Berlin, Heinrich Hahn in Frankfurt am Main and Scheuermann und Seifert in Berlin. As a result of this research, a painting by Rombout van Troyen, “Felsgrotte mit Opferszene” was restituted to the heirs of the Jewish physician Dr Hans Herxheimer from Frankfurt am Main (Frankfurt 1880-1944 Theresienstadt) and a painting by  Max Joseph Wagenbauer, “Großes Bauerngehöft am Dorfrand” (Great Farm with a Village in the far Distance) was the object of a financial settlement. Both paintings were purchased from the Hahn auction of  November 17–18, 1942

Selected works in the museum

References

External links
  

Art museums and galleries in Germany
Buildings and structures in Braunschweig
Culture in Braunschweig
Museums in Lower Saxony
Art museums established in 1754
Culture of Lower Saxony
1754 establishments in the Holy Roman Empire
Organisations based in Braunschweig